Chionodes optio is a moth in the family Gelechiidae. It is found in North America, where it has been recorded from Colorado, Texas, New Mexico, Arizona and California.

The larvae are leaf tiers on Quercus arizonica.

References

Chionodes
Moths described in 1999
Moths of North America